The cycling competition at the 1964 Summer Olympics consisted of two road cycling events and five track cycling events, all for men only. The 4000m individual pursuit event was introduced at these Games.

Medal summary

Road cycling

Track cycling

Participating nations
303 cyclists from 40 nations competed.

Medal table

References

External links
Official Olympic Report

 
1964 Summer Olympics events
1964
O
1964 in track cycling
1964 in road cycling
Cycle races in Japan